Marg or MARG may refer to:

People
 Elwin Marg (1918–2010), American optometrist and neuroscientist
 Harald Marg (born 1954), German canoer
 Marg Downey (born 1961), Australian comedian
 Marg Helgenberger, American actress
 Marg Moll (1884–1977), German sculptor, painter and author born Margarethe Haeffner
 Marg Osburne (1927–1977), Canadian country, folk and gospel singer
 Marg Ralston, Australian sports journalist, editor, and government advisor

Other uses
 Shortening of margarita (the tequila-based sour cocktail)
 El Marg, a district of Cairo, Egypt
 MARG Limited, an Indian construction company
 Marg (magazine), an Indian art magazine
 MARG (technology), sensors providing attitude information for aircraft 

Feminine given names